Blackson is a surname. Notable people with the surname include:

Angelo Blackson (born 1992), American football player
Delvechio Blackson (born 1995), Dutch footballer
Michael Blackson (born 1972), Ghanaian-born American actor and comedian